The Indianapolis Community Food Access Coalition (ICFAC) is a commitment by the city of Indianapolis, Indiana, to prioritize policies and activities to ensure affordable and equitable access to healthy and nutritious food for all residents. The Coalition was created through an Indianapolis Ordinance 337 in November 2020.

Mission 
ICFAC was created to help resolve city-wide food issues and enable communication between stakeholders in the food system, including food insecurity advocates, retailers, growers and supply chain. The main focus is to address issues of food insecurity and ensure all Indianapolis residents have access to healthy, nutritious food that supports optimal health and wellbeing.

Structure 
The Coalition was created to replace the Indy Food Council and is made up of city staff, leaders of various food organizations, and community members from eight of the regional neighborhoods in Indianapolis. It was created alongside the Indianapolis Community Food Access Advisory Commission (IndyFAC). The Commission was established under City-County Ordinance No. 40 to provide guidance and oversight for the Coalition. The Commission represents multiple aspects of the food system, including farmers, health and transportation officials, nonprofit organizations, small businesses, community leaders, and Purdue agricultural extension workers. ICFAC is affiliated with Indianapolis' Division of Community Nutrition and Food Policy.

The Division of Community Nutrition and Food Policy was created to address racial inequity in the food system, create food programs and policies, and reduce food insecurity with a focus on low-income areas and food deserts throughout Indianapolis. It includes and oversees both the Coalition and the Commission. The coalition operates independently of the Indianapolis government, but is funded through the city's Office of Public Health and Safety.

Purpose 
The coalition members came together in order to help those who struggle with access to healthy foods in low income areas. Their responsibilities include advising policymakers, funding sources, and organizations on food investment and initiatives; including incentivizing retailers with funding, including community development grants.

See also
Hunger in the United States

References 

Food security in the United States
2020 establishments in Indiana
Government of Indianapolis
2020s in Indianapolis